Patrick Johansson Keraudren (born October 23, 1946, in Rouen, France) is a French-born naturalized Mexican academic, researcher and professor of Nahuatl language. He is a Doctor of Letters from the University of Paris. Since 1979, he is a researcher of the Institute of Historical Research of the National Autonomous University of Mexico, and associate professor of Miguel Leon-Portilla in the Seminario de Cultura Nahuatl. Since 1992, he has taught Nahuatl literature at the Faculty of Arts at the same university.

Since 1995, he serves as academic coordinator of the Permanent Weekly Nahuatl Language and Culture Seminar at the University of Colima, giving lessons and conferences around Colima. He has been full professor of Nahuatl Culture and Weekly Bibliographical Research in the Institute of the Palafox Library of Puebla. He has been guest Columbian Literature professor at the Universidad de las Américas Puebla, the Mexican Institute of Tanatology, as well as visiting professor at the universities of Paris-Sorbonne and Toulouse-le-Mirail.

References

Sources
 Milbrath, Susan Heaven and Earth in Ancient Mexico: Astronomy and Seasonal Cycles in the Codex Borgia, University of Texas Press, Austin, p. 118. 

20th-century Mexican historians
21st-century Mexican historians
French emigrants to Mexico
Academic staff of the National Autonomous University of Mexico